Reksio is a Polish cartoon character who is the protagonist of the children's animated adventure-comedy Polish TV series of the same name. Reksio was created by Polish director Lechosław Marszałek. Its 65 episodes were designed and produced from 1967 to 1990 in a Polish animated films studio, more specifically in Studio Filmów Rysunkowych (situated in the city of Bielsko-Biała) which also made the more well-known Bolek and Lolek (there are even cameo appearances of Lolek and Bolek in Reksio).

All episodes describe the adventures of a friendly and courageous piebald terrier dog named Reksio along with his human owners (a middle class Polish family throughout most of the main series) and his animal friends, mostly living in the same courtyard as him, namely hens, cats, or other dogs (and their owners as well). Along with Lolek and Bolek, Reksio has achieved cult status in Poland. Additionally, there is even a crisps brand named after him in Poland. Furthermore, a series of educational, adventure, and puzzle video games for children were also created by Aidem Media from Gdańsk which are based on and star Reksio.

These educational video games were distributed even outside Poland, to other Central European and Eastern European countries (even to Russia) during the early to mid 2000s. In Romania, for example, they were distributed in educational gaming magazines for children by Erc Press. There was an additional second wave of video games developed by Aidem Media throughout the late 2000s and even early 2010s.

History
The history of Reksio began when the idea of Reksio was first thought of by the creator of the series, Lechosław Marszałek. The inspiration for the character Reksio came from a female rough-haired fox terrier dog named Trola. She belonged to the writer of the series, Lechosław Marszałek. The first episode of the series, Reksio poliglota, which was produced by Lechosław Marszałek and Studio Filmów Rysunkowych aired in 1967 on the national Polish television. This episode had poorer graphics and set design compared to the episodes that would be produced in the 1970s. Reksio also looked different, sporting a collar that he did not wear in later episodes.

All episodes that were produced until 1971 were produced by Lechosław Marszałek. In total, Marszałek directed 19 episodes and co-directed 1 episode, the most of any other director involved in the production of the animated series. Almost all of the episodes of the animated series can be watched on Youtube on the official channel of Studio Filmów Rysunkowych. The years 1972 and 1974 were the most productive ones for the main series, throughout which 7 new episodes were produced during each year.

Media appearances 

The character of Reksio has appeared not only in television, but also in computer games, as statues, and other media. These include the following:

 A "Reksio" television series consisting of 65 episodes.
 Series of educational games that star the Reksio character produced by Aidem Media in Poland.
 A series of adventure and puzzle games produced by Aidem Media that star Reksio. These games include the "City of Secrets" series.
 A bronze statue of Reksio situated in a square named "Plac Reksia" located in the Polish city of Bielsko-Biała. Reksio is pointing towards a fountain next to the statue.

Video games 

In the passing of time, there have been various video games developed and released by Aidem Media starring Reksio (for both PC and iOS). They are the following ones:

 Liczę z Reksiem/I Count with Reksio (educational puzzle game) - 2001
 Abc z Reksiem/ABC with Reksio (educational puzzle game) - 2001
 Reksio i Skarb Piratów/Reksio and the Pirates' Island (adventure game) - 2003
 Wesołe przedszkole Reksia/The Merry Kindergarten of Reksio (educational puzzle game) - 2003
 Reksio i UFO/Reksio and the UFO (adventure game) - 2003
 Reksio i ortografia/Reksio and spelling (educational puzzle game) - 2003
 Reksio i Czarodzieje/Reksio and the wizards (adventure game) - 2004
 Reksio i Wehikuł Czasu/Reksio and the Time Machine (adventure game) - 2004
 Reksio i kapitan Nemo/Reksio and Captain Nemo (adventure game) - 2006
 Reksio i Kretes w Akcji!/Reksio and Kretes in action! (arcade game) - 2007
 Reksio i Kretes: Tajemnica Trzeciego Wymiaru/Reksio and Kretes - The Mystery of the Third Dimension (arcade game) - 2007
 Łamigłówki Reksia: Wielki Odkrywca/Reksio's puzzles: great explorer (puzzle game) - 2008
 Reksio i Miasto Sekretów/Reksio and the City of Secrets (adventure game) - 2009 for PC and 2011/2012 for iOS

Full list of episodes

Reksio's profile as main character 

As the main character of his own series, Reksio is clearly the protagonist. Throughout the main series, he is depicted as a responsible, loving, caring, and respectful dog to both his owner, a blonde Polish kid, as well as to the other animals with which he lives in the same courtyard. Sometimes though, he is a little bit mischievous (but only in rare contexts) with his older owners or other humans with whom he interacts. In addition, Reksio also has a special bond with a female dog with red-haired ears.

Most of the time, however, he is portrayed as a saviour, helper, rescuer, and peacemaker (and occasionally as a wanderer). In these regards, he is seen protecting the hens in his courtyard against foxes who want to steal their eggs as well as managing or settling conflicts between other animals who live in the same courtyard with him. He is courageous enough to save or aid some humans in some dangerous situations as well, most notably his young owner, a blonde Polish kid, from gas intoxication in his kitchen in one episode.

Yet his help is not only limited to his young owner or the animals in his courtyard, as in the second series, more specifically in Reksio and the birds series, Reksio can be seen as an empathetic saviour for a stork and a cuckoo (originally 'pigeon' in the title of that episode), outside animals/birds. While he is mostly friendly towards all animals living in the same courtyard as him, Reksio has occasional skirmishes with the rooster (throughout the main series). In addition, several times during the Reksio and birds series, Reksio has occasional quarrels with the gander living in his courtyard as well. Last but not least, he is a great friend to the owl who shares with him music and convinces him not to live the courtyard at the end of the second series.

Gallery

Notes

References

External links
 SFR - Studio Filmów Rysunkowych Bielsko Biała
 

Television characters introduced in 1967
1967 Polish television series debuts
1990 Polish television series endings
1960s animated television series
1970s animated television series
1980s animated television series
1990s animated television series
1960s comedy television series
1970s comedy television series
1980s comedy television series
1990s comedy television series
Fictional dogs
Polish children's animated adventure television series
Polish children's animated comedy television series
Telewizja Polska original programming
Animated television series about dogs